Ulawun is a basaltic and andesitic stratovolcano in West New Britain Province, on the island of New Britain in Papua New Guinea.

A total of 22 recorded eruptions have occurred since the 18th century; the first, in 1700, was recorded by William Dampier. Several thousand people live near the volcano. Because of its eruptive history and proximity to populated areas, Ulawun has been deemed one of the Decade Volcanoes.

Recent activity
The last few years have seen almost constant activity at Ulawun, with frequent small explosions, and have caused great damage and loss of life.
the New Britain Highway in three different locations.

Volcanoes in Papua New Guinea are some of the world's most prolific sources of sulphur dioxide. Recent studies have shown that Ulawun alone releases about 7 kg/s of SO2, which is about 2% of the global total of SO2 emissions into the atmosphere.

Ulawun has been named one of the Decade Volcanoes, 16 volcanoes identified as being worthy of particular study in light of their history of large, destructive eruptions and their proximity to populated areas. By Abubakr Sattar

View

See also

List of volcanoes in Papua New Guinea
List of ultras of Oceania

References

 McGonigle A.J.S., Oppenheimer C., Tsanev V.I. et al. (2004),  Sulphur dioxide fluxes from Papua New Guinea's volcanoes, Geophysical Research Letters, v. 31, issue 8
 Johnson, RW, Davies, RA and White, AJR (1972) Ulawun Volcano, New Britain. Canberra, Department of National Development, Bureau of Mineral Resources, Geology and Geophysics Bulletin 142, PNG 5.

External links
 Information from the Papua New Guinea Geological Survey
 "Mount Ulawun, Papua New Guinea" on Peakbagger

Volcanoes of New Britain
Active volcanoes
Decade Volcanoes
Mountains of Papua New Guinea
Stratovolcanoes of Papua New Guinea
VEI-4 volcanoes
West New Britain Province